Wilmer Thomas Ewell (October 15, 1895 – June 9, 1966), alternately spelled "Euell", was an American Negro league catcher in the 1920s.

A native of Milford, Ohio, Ewell made his Negro leagues debut in 1925 with the Indianapolis ABCs, and played for the ABCs again the following season. He died in Cincinnati, Ohio in 1966 at age 70.

References

External links
 and Seamheads

1895 births
1966 deaths
Indianapolis ABCs players
Baseball catchers
Baseball players from Ohio
People from Milford, Ohio
20th-century African-American sportspeople